The Threats are a punk band from Dalkeith and Edinburgh, Scotland. Originally formed in 1979 as the Reflectors, the band soon renamed themselves Threats.

History
The Threats formed in 1979 as the Reflectors.

By the early 1980s, many punk rock acts had begun to explore political issues.  The Threats followed this trend, writing songs that addressed contemporary social issues.  Their song Iron Maiden was directed at Prime Minister Margaret Thatcher.  Afghanistan, which featured on the B-side of the Go to Hell single, was a response to the Soviet war in Afghanistan.

The name of the band is actually "Threats" although often with "The " preceding the name.

The Casualties covered the Threats track "Underground Army" on one of their 1998 album of the same name.

Line-ups
The Line-ups of the band over the years are as follows:-

Line Up No1

Jim Threat - Guitar

Scott Mcleary  - Vocals

Gogsy Threat - Drums

Joe Amos - bass

This line up never recorded any material but did gig around Edinburgh in the late 1970s

Line Up  No2

Jim Threat - Vocals and Guitar

Gogsy Threat - Guitar

Joe Amos - Drums

Ian Simpson - Bass Guitar

This Line up Recorded the Backlash Compilation and features on the Demos and Rarities CD Album

Line Up No3

Jim Threat - Vocals

Gogsy Threat - Guitar

Tin - Bass Guitar

Mick Amos - Drums

This Line up recorded the Go To Hell Single and features on the Demos and Rarities CD Album

Line Up No4

Jim Threat - Vocals

Gogsy Threat - Guitar

Mick Amos - Drums

Dylan - Bass Guitar

This Line up recorded the Politicians and Ministers 6 Track EP and features on the Demos and Rarities CD Album

Line Up No5

Jim Threat - Vocals and Guitar

Craig Robertson - Drums

Dave Threat - Bass Guitar

This Line Up Recorded the Back In Hell 3 Track EP

Line Up No6

Jim Threat - Vocals and Guitar

Craig Robertson - Drums

Dave Threat - Bass Guitar

Gogsy Threat - Guitar

Davie Metal - Drums

This Line Up recorded the 6 Track Back in Hell EP

Line Up No7

Jim Threat - Vocals and Guitar

Dave Threat - Bass Guitar

Gogsy Threat - Guitar

Davie Metal - Drums

This Line Up recorded the Twelve Punk Moves Album and recorded the Live at CBGB's Vinyl Album

Line Up No8

Jim Threat - Vocals and Guitar

Dave Threat - Bass Guitar

Gogsy Threat - Guitar

Rick - Drums

This Line Up recorded the God Is Not With Us Today Album

Line Up No9 

Gogsy Threat - Vocals and Guitar

Bobe - Bass Guitar

Rab - Guitar

Rick - Drums

Line Up N10 - 

Gogsy Threat - Vocals and Guitar

Chris - Bass Guitar

Rab - Guitar

Rick - Drums

Line Up N11 - Current Line up

Gogsy Threat - Guitar

Chris - Bass Guitar

Rab - Guitar

Rick - Drums

Kev - Vocals

Releases
The early vinyl record releases were:-
Backlash (Playlist Records). 1 Track on a multi sampler EP : Members - Jim, Gogsy, Simpson, Amos
Go to Hell (Rondelet Records). 3 track 7" Single c/w Afghanistan and Wasted : Members - Jim, Gogsy, Tin, Amos
Politicians and Ministers (Rondelet Records). 3 Track 7" single c/w Writing on the wall and Dead End Depression. : Members - Jim, Gogsy, Amos, Dylan
Politicians and Ministers (Rondelet Records). 6 Track 12" single c/w Writing on the wall, Dead End Depression, Can't Stop Me, Underground Army, 1980's. : Members - Jim, Gogsy, Amos, Dylan
Back in Hell 3 track vinyl on Intimidation records Members : Jim, Craigy, Dave
Back in Hell 6 Track CD on Punknite Records : Members - Jim, Craigy, Dave, Gogsy, Metal
12 Punk Moves Dr. Strange Records 2003 : Members - Jim, Gogsy, Dave, Metal
Live at CBGB's Dr Strange Records 2003 : Members - Jim, Gogsy, Dave, Metal
Demos and Rarities Dr Strange Records 2003: Members - Jim, Gogsy, Simpson, Amos, Tin, Dylan
God is not with Us Today Dr Strange Records 2007: Members - Jim, Gogsy, Dave, Rick
Live at the Banshee Labyrinth BandCamp 2019: Members - Gogsy, Rick, Rab, Chris, Kev

References
The Threats web site

Scottish punk rock groups
People from Dalkeith